Emmermeer is a neighbourhood of the city of Emmen in Drenthe, the Netherlands. It was a former lake near Emmen.

References 

Populated places in Drenthe
Emmen, Netherlands